Neoatractosomatidae is a family of millipedes belonging to the order Chordeumatida.

Genera:
 Brentomeron Verhoeff, 1934
 Cyrnosoma Mauriès, 2015
 Epirosomella Strasser, 1976
 Mesotrimeron Verhoeff, 1912
 Microbrachysoma Verhoeff, 1897
 Neoatractosoma Silvestri, 1898
 Osellasoma Mauriès, 1984
 Pseudocraspedosoma Silvestri, 1898
 Schizmohetera Mršić, 1987
 Trimerophorella Verhoeff, 1902
 Trimerophoron Rothenbühler, 1900

References

Chordeumatida